Darryl Brian Ricky Lachman (born 11 November 1989) is a Curaçaoan professional  footballer who plays as a centre-back for A-League club Perth Glory and the Curaçao national team. He has formerly played for Groningen, PEC Zwolle, Twente, Sheffield Wednesday, SC Cambuur, Willem II, and Hapoel Ra'anana.

Club career
Lachman began his club career in the Netherlands with Groningen, he made seven appearances for them before moving to Eerste Divisie club PEC Zwolle. He spent three seasons at PEC Zwolle which included promotion to the Eredivisie in his first season and a KNVB Cup triumph in his final season. After making 91 appearances and scoring two goals for the club, Lachman moved clubs again as he joined Twente. His time with Twente lasted just one season as, after making 15 league appearances, Lachman left the Netherlands to join English Championship club Sheffield Wednesday. He failed to make a competitive appearance between July 2015 and January 2016 for Sheffield Wednesday. On 7 January 2016, Lachman returned to his homeland as he agreed to join Cambuur on loan for the rest of the season. He left Sheffield Wednesday in the summer 2017.

International career
Lachman was called up by the Netherlands U21 national team on two separate occasions, but did not make an appearance.

Lachman made his debut for the Curaçao national team in a qualification match for the 2018 FIFA World Cup against Montserraton 28 March 2015.

Career statistics

Club

International
Scores and results list Curaçao's goal tally first, score column indicates score after each Lachman goal.

|+ List of international goals scored by Darryl Lachman
|-
| style="text-align:center"|1 || 1 April 2015 || Blakes Estate Stadium, Look Out, Montserrat ||  || style="text-align:center"|1–0 || style="text-align:center"|2–2 || 2018 FIFA World Cup qualification || 
|}

Honours
PEC Zwolle
Eerste Divisie: 2011–12
KNVB Cup: 2013–14

Curaçao
 Caribbean Cup: 2017
 King's Cup: 2019

References

External links
 Voetbal International profile 

1989 births
Living people
Dutch people of Indian descent
Dutch people of Curaçao descent
Dutch sportspeople of Surinamese descent
Curaçao footballers
Dutch footballers
Footballers from Zaanstad
Association football central defenders
Curaçao international footballers
Eredivisie players
Eerste Divisie players
Israeli Premier League players
English Football League players
A-League Men players
FC Groningen players
PEC Zwolle players
FC Twente players
Jong FC Twente players
Sheffield Wednesday F.C. players
SC Cambuur players
Willem II (football club) players
Hapoel Ra'anana A.F.C. players
Perth Glory FC players
2017 CONCACAF Gold Cup players
2019 CONCACAF Gold Cup players
Curaçao expatriate footballers
Dutch expatriate footballers
Curaçao expatriate sportspeople in England
Dutch expatriate sportspeople in England
Expatriate footballers in England
Curaçao expatriate sportspeople in Israel
Dutch expatriate sportspeople in Israel
Expatriate footballers in Israel
Curaçao expatriate sportspeople in Australia
Dutch expatriate sportspeople in Australia
Expatriate soccer players in Australia